Koleczkowo  is a village in the administrative district of Gmina Szemud, within Wejherowo County, Pomeranian Voivodeship, in northern Poland. It is located within the historic region of Pomerania.

The village has a population of 1,750.

There is a Rehabilitation Center in Koleczkowo.

History

Koleczkowo was a royal village of the Polish Crown, administratively located in the Gdańsk County in the Pomeranian Voivodeship.

During German occupation of Poland (World War II), in 1944, Koleczkowo was the site of a battle between the Polish underground resistance movement and the German occupiers. There is a memorial commemorating the battle in the village.

Notable people
  (1912–1944), Polish military officer, activist, member of the Pomeranian Griffin Polish secret resistance organization during the German occupation of Poland (World War II)

References

Koleczkowo